KPIA may refer to:

 KPIA-LP, a low-power radio station (102.5 FM) licensed to Huntsville, Texas, United States
 the ICAO code for General Wayne Downing Peoria International Airport